Andorre-L'Hospitalet (before 2008: L'Hospitalet-près-l'Andorre) is a railway station in L'Hospitalet-près-l'Andorre, Occitanie, France. The station is on the Portet-Saint-Simon–Puigcerdà railway and was opened on 22 July 1929. The station is served by TER (local) and Intercités de nuit (night trains) services operated by the SNCF. The station is 1429m above sea level.

Train services
The following services currently call at L'Hospitalet-près-l'Andorre:
night service (Intercités de nuit) Paris–Toulouse–Pamiers–Latour-de-Carol–Enveitg
local service (TER Occitanie) Toulouse–Foix–Latour-de-Carol–Enveitg

Bus services

This station can be used for connections to Andorra. Three buses per day operate, leaving L'Hospitalet-près-l'Andorre at 07:45 and 19:45. An SNCF bus also leaves the station at 09:35 running as far as Pas de la Casa from where connections are available using local buses to other towns within Andorra (see external links below).

References

External links

L'Hospitalet to Andorra bus timetable 

Railway stations in Ariège (department)
Railway stations in France opened in 1929